Aris Karasavvidis (born 13 March 1965) is a retired Greek football striker. He became top goalscorer of the 1988 UEFA European Under-21 Championship.

References

1965 births
Living people
Greek footballers
Aetos Skydra F.C. players
PAOK FC players
Apollon Smyrnis F.C. players
Super League Greece players
Greece under-21 international footballers
Greece international footballers
Association football forwards
People from Skydra
Footballers from Central Macedonia